Alacrite (also known as Alloy L-605, Cobalt L-605, Haynes 25, and occasionally F90) is a family of cobalt-based alloys. The alloy exhibits useful mechanical properties and is oxidation- and sulfidation-resistant.

One member of the family, XSH Alacrite, is described as "a non-magnetic, stainless super-alloy whose high surface hardness enables one to achieve a mirror quality polish."  The Institut National de Métrologie in France has also used the material as a kilogram mass standard.

Composition and standardization
L-605 is composed primarily of cobalt (Co), with a specified mixture of chromium (Cr), tungsten (W), nickel (Ni), iron (Fe) and carbon (C), as well as small amounts of manganese (Mn), silicon (Si), and phosphorus (P). The tungsten and nickel improve the alloy's machinability, while chromium contributes to its solid-solution strengthening. The following tolerances must be met to be considered an L-605 alloy:

Properties and Applications 
Alacrite or Alloy L-605 is one of the strongest cobalt alloys available. It is highly resistant to scaling and oxidation, and can be used in oxidising environments up to temperatures of 1093°C.

Alloy L605 can be welded using gas tungsten arc, gas metal arc, shielded metal arc, electron beam and resistance welding. It’s important to use good joint fit-up, minimum restraint, low interpass temperature and cool rapidly when welding. For maximum ductility, fabricated components should be annealed 1176-1232°C and rapidly cooled.

The alloy was originally developed for application in aircraft, including combustion chambers, liners, afterburners and the hot section of gas turbines. It has also been used in aerospace components and turbine engines as well as drug-eluting and other kinds of stents due to its biocompatibility. When used for implantable medical devices, the ASTM F90-09 and ISO 5832-5:2005 specifications dictate how L-605 is manufactured and tested.

References

Biomaterials
Cobalt alloys